Frances Tiafoe was the defending champion but chose not to defend his title.

Dan Evans won the title after defeating Jordan Thompson 6–4, 6–4 in the final.

Seeds

Draw

Finals

Top half

Bottom half

References

External links
Main draw
Qualifying draw

Nottingham Open - 1
2022 men's singles